Adimai Changili is a 1997 Indian Tamil language action drama film directed by R. K. Selvamani. The film stars Arjun and Roja, while Rambha, Sunitha,  Anandaraj and M. N. Nambiar play supporting roles.

Cast
Arjun as Karthikeyan
Roja as Senthamarai
Rambha as Radha
Sunitha 
Anandaraj
Charle
M. N. Nambiar
Chinni Jayanth
Vadivelu
Visu
Ponnambalam

Production
During the making of the film, it was reported that Roja fell out with the director due to his excessive promotion of the film's other heroine Rambha over her.

Soundtrack
Soundtrack was composed by Deva.

Reception
New Straits Times called the film "a polished effort despite the poor finish".

References

External links

1997 films
Indian action films
Films scored by Deva (composer)
1990s Tamil-language films
1997 action films
Films directed by R. K. Selvamani